Amigdalae is a biofeedback based art project by the artist Massimiliano Peretti. The project has been presented for the first time in a scientific environment at the CNRS, National Center of Scientific Research in Paris, November 2005. This project explores how emotional reactions filter and distort human perception and observation.

During the performance, biofeedback medical technology, such as encephalography, body temperature variations, heart rate and galvanic responses, will be used to analyze people's emotional status as they watch video art. Using these signals, the music changes, so that the consequent sound environment will simultaneously mirror and distort the viewer's emotional state.

Technical specifications
In the field of experimental psychology, neuropsychology and psychobiology, the process of tracking and recording cerebrum-cortical electrical activity, and its combination with other values of psychomotor activity, enables the diagnosis of the emotional responses of an individual.

Psycho-physiological states are assigned to different electrical values. These variations in electrical potential can be recorded with the use of contact electrodes; in most academic situations they are connected to a signal amplifier and an inkjet instrument that reacts to the variations of potential and amplitude of the input data. This instrument, commonly known as electroencephalograph, has been of the utmost importance regarding studies on the functioning of cerebral activity during the awakened state of an individual, the sleeping state, emotional states, and during physiological and psychological disturbances. The recorded data, electroencephalogram, are permanent memories of a distinct period of cerebral activity.

There is other psychophysical data, related to human behaviors, which can be tracked along with variations in brain activity; this data is generally defined as biofeedback.

Crucial elements in the study of psychological states are cardiac frequency, electro muscular activity EMG, and body temperature. Their interpretation gives a detailed response about the psychic activity of an individual.
EEG By using an electroencephalograph and a digital interface we can make use of an electrical value, which is output by four sensors placed on the forehead, as a tracking guide of general brain activity. The signals are recorded in real-time and they vary according to psycho-emotional variations in the individual, or according to mutations in the surrounding environment.
The average time for tracking and recording the data is seven minutes. The generated graph is based on a detailed interpretation of the four types of brain waves: alpha, beta, delta and theta. Their values are shown in amplitude (volts), frequency (hertz), and isolated peaks of electrical activity: the amplitude is higher than hundred volts and low in frequency, or short shocks of high frequency waves and small amplitude.
EMG The electrical muscular response is recorded through the use of a dedicated sensor. Also in this case the signal gets digitized and elaborated by software that defines the thresholds of reaction of the individual and that compares the output data. We take in consideration the area related to facial muscles, particularly the forehead and eyebrows, as they tend to have a more pronounced reaction to emotional activation.
Cardiac Frequency The heartbeat is recorded through a frequency sensor placed on the index finger of the left hand, and its data is monitored and recorded through the entire duration of the experience.
Body Temperature A temperature sensor is placed on the palm of the right hand and communicates to the biofeedback machine through the recording of micro thermal variations.

Peretti's work
The analysis of the observed artwork is central in Peretti's work. He showed how perception and emotional reactions can be eternally modified by the influence of environmental elements. In his art installations personal opinions are controlled and directed by external stimuli, like in the reality, points of view are filtered or deformed by mass communication languages, culture and society.

The main theme of the vast video archive created through the use of biofeedback technology is the dissociative behavior that anticipates emotional reactions.

External links
 https://web.archive.org/web/20051014121958/http://cogimage.dsi.cnrs.fr/documents/AMIGDALAEdoc.pdf 
 https://web.archive.org/web/20071012145912/http://www.scope-art.com/index.php?option=com_content&task=view&id=102&Itemid=206
 CNRS link: http://cogimage.dsi.cnrs.fr/seminaires/resume_amygdalae_2005.htm 

Multimedia works